In geography and cartography, hemispheres of Earth are any division of the globe into two equal halves (hemispheres) usually as divided into northern and southern halves by the equator, or into western and eastern halves by an imaginary line passing through the poles.

Geographical Hemispheres 
The primary hemispherical split geographically is made by latitudinal (north/south) and longitudinal (east-west) markers:

 North–South
 Northern Hemisphere, the half that lies north of the Equator
 Southern Hemisphere, the half that lies south of the Equator

 East–West
 Eastern Hemisphere, the half that lies east of the prime meridian and west of the 180th meridian
 Western Hemisphere, the half that lies west of the prime meridian and east of the 180th meridian

Alternative Hemispheres 
Alternative Earth Hemispheres can divide the earth along cultural and religious lines, or to maximise the preponderance of geographic features, for example land and water.

The East–West division can also be seen in a cultural and religious sense, as a division into two cultural and religious hemispheres.  

An alternative geographical hemisphere splits the earth at 20° west and 160° east so that Africa and Europe are not divided, and the Earth may also be split into hemispheres of day and night by the terrestrial terminator.

Land-water hemispheres 
Alternative hemispheres schemes have sought to divide the planet in a way that maximises the preponderance of one geographic feature or another in each division, for example the land-water division:

 Land Hemisphere, the hemisphere on Earth containing the largest possible area of land
 Water Hemisphere, the hemisphere on Earth containing the largest possible area of water

See also
 Earth's geographical centre
 Global North and Global South
 Land and water hemispheres
 East–West dichotomy

References

External links 

 
Geography